Senkovo is a rural locality (a village) in Volosatovskoye Rural Settlement, Selivanovsky District, Vladimir Oblast, Russia. The population was 2 as of 2010.

Geography 
Senkovo is located 21 km west of Krasnaya Gorbatka (the district's administrative centre) by road. Skalovo is the nearest rural locality.

References 

Rural localities in Selivanovsky District
Sudogodsky Uyezd